The 2022 Kelantan season was the club's 77th season since its establishment. The club participated in the Malaysia Premier League, the Malaysia FA Cup and the Malaysia Cup.

Technical staff

Competitions

Malaysia Premier League

League table

Matches

Malaysia FA Cup

Malaysia Cup

Squad statistics

Appearances and goals

|-
|colspan="16"|Goalkeepers:
|-

|-
|colspan="16"|Defenders:
|-

|-
|colspan="16"|Midfielders:
|-

|-
|colspan="16"|Forwards:
|-

|-
|colspan="16"|Players that have left the club:

|-

References

2022
Kelantan
Kelantan F.C.